Lubomyr Melnyk (born December 22, 1948) is a composer and pianist of Ukrainian origin.

Melnyk is noted for his continuous music, a piano technique based on extremely rapid notes and complex note-series, usually with the sustain pedal held down to generate harmonic overtones and sympathetic resonances. "This is a completely-completely different piano universe from everything that has existed before", Melnyk explains.

Music 
Melnyk links his piano technique to his national identity. "This music would not exist at all if I were not Ukrainian. Our distinguishing feature is that we tend to sacrifice ourselves. Ukrainians are self-sacrificing for things that are important to them".Melnyk plays rapid sequences thanks to his ability to play up to 19 notes per second with each hand. These overtones blend or clash according to harmonic changes. Most of his music is for piano, but he has also composed chamber music and orchestral works. Of his technique, he has said:

There's an act of creation. For this act of creation to happen every day the body of the pianist, and not just the fingers, but the entire body has to be transformed. Because in order to make these very small changes and very small decisions that I make when I'm creating music, or when I playing the music, it has to happen at a faster speed of time than any other music. The mind has to control many things. So the decisions happen in another dimension than what the fingers are doing. Part of my mind controls the fingers, part of my mind controls my hand, part of my mind is controlling my entire body, part of my mind is thinking about something else, and part of my mind is combining everything. For the body to be able to reach this enormous universe, which is huge, it has to be changed. This is what continuous music is about.

Biography 

Melnyk lived in Paris from 1973 to 1975, supporting himself by playing for modern dance classes, most notably in conjunction with Carolyn Carlson at the Paris Opera. Many of his works were presented in conjunction with modern dance. Through his work with Carlson, he began to create continuous music for piano.

Melnyk has composed over 120 works, mostly for piano solo and double piano, and some for piano with ensemble. To explain the proper physical and mental techniques for his music, Melnyk wrote a treatise, OPEN TIME: The Art of Continuous Music (1981) and 22 Etudes, to teach the fundamental levels of his continuous technique. 

In 1985, Melnyk set two world records, documented on film and with full audio, at the Sigtuna Stiftelsen in Sweden. He sustained speeds of over 19.5 notes per second in each hand, and played between 13 and 14 notes per second for one full hour.

Discography
KMH: Piano Music in the Continuous Mode (1979)
The Lund - St. Petri Symphony (1983)
Concert-Requiem (1983)
Poslaniye (1983)
The Stone Knight (1983)
The Song of Galadriel (1985)
Remnants of Man / The Fountain (1985)
Wave-Lox (1985)
The Voice Of Trees (1985)
NICHE / NOURISH / NICHE-XONs (1988)
A Portrait Of Petlura On The Day He Was Killed {Lyrrest} (1989)
It Was Revealed Unto Us That Man Is The Centre Of The Universe (1993)
Swallows (1994)
Vocalizes and Antiphons (1991-1994)
Beyond Romance (2010)
The Self-Luminous Way (2011)
Windmills (2013)
Corollaries (2013) (Erased Tapes Records)
Three Solo Pieces (2013) 
Evertina (2014) (Erased Tapes Records)
Rivers and Streams (2015) (Erased Tapes Records)
illirion (2016) (Sony Classical Records / Sounds of Subterrania )
The Dreamers Ever Leave You - The Lauren Harris Ballet Music (2018) (Audio Sushi)
Fallen Trees (2018) (Erased Tapes Records)

References

Sources 
Encyclopedia of Music in Canada: "Melnyk, Lubomyr"
Schulman, Michael, 'Despite all his problems, Lubomyr Melnyk labours on,' Canadian Composer, 117, January 1977
Prokosh, Kevin, 'Piano attacked in samurai style,' Winnipeg Free Press, 10 January 1997
Eddins, Stephen, 'A major feat of virtuosity', AllMusic, 2007
Powell, Mike, 'Minimalism at its most lush, ornate, and taxing', Pitchfork, 23 August 2007
Fifteen Questions with Lubomyr Melnyk, 
Erased Tapes Records:

External links

Interview: Lubomyr Melnyk on Achieving Transcendence Through the Piano

Living people
1948 births
Canadian composers
Canadian male composers
Canadian people of Ukrainian descent
Canadian male pianists
21st-century Canadian pianists
21st-century Canadian male musicians
Erased Tapes Records artists